Not for Kids Only is an album of children's songs released by Jerry Garcia and David Grisman. Most of the songs come from the Southeast region of the United States. It was released by Acoustic Disc.

The song "Jenny Jenkins" is featured in the 2015 compilation album This Record Belongs To....

Critical reception

On AllMusic, Lindsay Planer said, "Not for Kids Only (1993) is an album of folkie standards and traditional tunes... The obvious kinship between the musicians radiates throughout every track as their moods alternate between light and silly "There Ain't No Bugs on Me" to the darker-edged "When First Unto This Country".... One of the most endearing cuts is the comedic dialogue between Garcia and Grisman on "Arkansas Traveller"."

In The Music Box, John Metzger wrote, "[In the early-to-mid 1990s Jerry Garcia] managed to find time to reconnect with old pal David Grisman for a series of recording projects, jam sessions, and occasional concert performances. The second album spawned from this fruitful collaboration was the lighthearted Not for Kids Only. As the title suggests, one need not have children to enjoy this collection of traditional tunes and folk standards."

Track listing

 "Jenny Jenkins" (Traditional) - 4:22
 "Freight Train" (Elizabeth Cotten) - 5:20
 "A Horse Named Bill" (Traditional) - 3:04
 "Three Men Went A-Hunting" (Traditional) - 3:15
 "When First Unto This Country" (Traditional) - 4:01
 "Arkansas Traveller" (Traditional) - 3:28
 "Hopalong Peter" (Traditional) - 2:37
 "Teddy Bears' Picnic" (Irving Berlin) - 4:26
 "There Ain't No Bugs On Me" (Fiddlin' John Carson arr. by David Grisman) - 4:50
 "The Miller's Will" (Traditional) - 3:09
 "Hot Corn, Cold Corn" (Traditional) - 4:02
 "A Shenandoah Lullaby" ("Oh Shenandoah" and an instrumental version of Brahms' Lullaby) (Traditional) - 7:52

Personnel
 David Grisman - mandolin, mandocello, tenor banjo, vocals
 Jerry Garcia - guitar, vocals, artwork
 Hal Blaine - percussion, tambourine
 Joe Craven - violin, percussion, foot stomping
 Matt Eakle - piccolo, penny whistle
 Larry Granger - violoncello
 Larry Hanks - Jew's-Harp
 Heather Katz - violin
 Jim Kerwin - bass
 Daniel Kobialka - violin
 Pamela Lanford - English horn, oboe
 Jim Miller - slap bass
 Rick Montgomery - guitar
 Kevin Porter - trombone
 John Rosenberg - piano
 Jim Rothermel - clarinet
 Willow Scarlett - harmonica
 Nanci Severance - viola
 Jody Stecher - violin, vocals
 Peter Welker - trumpet

References

Acoustic Disc albums
Jerry Garcia albums
1993 albums
David Grisman albums
Collaborative albums
Children's music albums by American artists
Covers albums